Coleophora sardiniae is a moth of the family Coleophoridae. It is found on Sardinia.

The larvae feed on Genista corsica and possibly Genista lobelii. They feed on the generative organs of their host plant.

References

sardiniae
Moths described in 1983
Endemic fauna of Italy
Moths of Europe